Arborfield Airport  is located  north-east of Arborfield, Saskatchewan, Canada right beside the community and rural municipality yards.

See also
List of airports in Saskatchewan

References

External links
Page about this airport on COPA's Places to Fly airport directory

Certified airports in Saskatchewan
Arborfield No. 456, Saskatchewan